The 1976 Puerto Rican general elections were held in Puerto Rico on 2 November 1976. Carlos Romero Barceló of the New Progressive Party (PNP) was elected Governor, whilst the PNP also won a majority of the seats in the House of Representatives and the Senate. Voter turnout was 86.1%.

Results

Governor

House of Representatives

Senate

References

1976 elections in the Caribbean
General elections in Puerto Rico
Elections
Puerto Rico